Seven Sinners (UK title Cafe of the Seven Sinners) is a 1940 American drama romance film directed by Tay Garnett starring Marlene Dietrich and John Wayne in the first of three films they made together. The film was produced by Universal Pictures in black and white.

Plot
Torch singer Bijou Blanche has been kicked off one South Seas island after another. She is accompanied by naval deserter Edward Patrick 'Little Ned' Finnegan and magician/pickpocket Sasha Mencken. Eventually, she meets a handsome young naval officer, Lt. Dan Brent, and the two fall in love. When Brent vows to marry Bijou, his commander and others plead with him to leave her.

Cast
 Marlene Dietrich as Bijou Blanche
 John Wayne as Lt. Dan Brent
 Albert Dekker as Dr. Martin
 Broderick Crawford as Edward Patrick 'Little Ned' Finnegan
 Anna Lee as Dorothy Henderson
 Mischa Auer as Sasha Mencken
 Billy Gilbert as Tony
 Richard Carle as District Officer
 Samuel S. Hinds as Gov. Harvey Henderson
 Oskar Homolka as Antro 
 Reginald Denny as Capt. Church
 Vince Barnett as Bartender
 Herbert Rawlinson as First Mate
 James Craig as Ensign
 William Bakewell as Ens. Judson

Production

Dietrich had just revived her career with Destry Rides Again (1939) and this film featured many of the same elements, including cast members Mischa Auer, Billy Gilbert and Samuel S. Hinds. She was paid $150,000 for her performance.

The film was the second American film for Anna Lee (although the first to be released). She says Marlene Dietrich insisted Lee dye her hair from blonde to brown so she would not clash with Dietrich. She also says Dietrich selected John Wayne as her leading man after spotting him in the commissary and saying to producer Joe Pasternak, "Mommy wants that for Christmas."

Filming took place from July to September 14, 1940. In 1950, the film was remade as South Sea Sinner, starring Macdonald Carey and Shelley Winters.

See also
 Marlene Dietrich filmography
 Randolph Scott filmography
 John Wayne filmography
 The Spoilers (1942 film), with Marlene Dietrich, Randolph Scott, and John Wayne
Pittsburgh (1942 film), with Marlene Dietrich, Randolph Scott, and John Wayne

References

External links

Seven Sinners at TCMDB
Review of film at New York Times

1940 films
1940 romantic comedy films
American black-and-white films
American romantic comedy films
Films directed by Tay Garnett
Films produced by Joe Pasternak
Films set in Oceania
Films scored by Frank Skinner
Films scored by Hans J. Salter
Universal Pictures films
1940s American films